The Venezuelan regional elections, 2000 took place on 30 July 2000, alongside the 2000 Venezuelan parliamentary election and 2000 Venezuelan presidential election. The regional elections were for Venezuelan state governorships and mayorships. The Fifth Republic Movement (supported by its Patriotic Pole partners) took 14 of the 23 governorships, while COPEI took 2 and joint Democratic Action-COPEI candidates took another 2. The new First Justice won two mayoral races for Chacao and Baruta.

References

Venezuela
2000
2000 in Venezuela
Election